The 2015 Samarkand Challenger was a professional tennis tournament played on clay courts. It was the 19th edition of the tournament which was part of the 2015 ATP Challenger Tour. It took place in Samarkand, Uzbekistan between 11 and 16 May 2015.

Singles main-draw entrants

Seeds

 1 Rankings are as of May 4, 2015.

Other entrants
The following players received wildcards into the singles main draw:
  Sanjar Fayziev
  Temur Ismailov
  Jurabek Karimov
  Shonigmatjon Shofayziyev

The following players received entry from the qualifying draw:
  Luke Bambridge
  Mikhail Elgin
  Ivan Gakhov
  Divij Sharan

The following player received entry as a lucky loser:
  Riccardo Ghedin

Doubles main-draw entrants

Seeds

 1 Rankings are as of May 4, 2015.

Other entrants
The following pairs received wildcards into the doubles main draw:
  Sanjar Fayziev /  Jurabek Karimov
  Temur Ismailov /  Shonigmatjon Shofayziyev
  Batyr Sapaev /  Khumoun Sultanov

Champions

Singles

 Teymuraz Gabashvili def.  Yuki Bhambri, 6–3, 6–1

Doubles

 Sergey Betov /  Michail Elgin def.  Laslo Djere /  Peđa Krstin, 6–4, 6–3

External links
Official Website

Samarkand Challenger
Samarkand Challenger
2015 in Uzbekistani sport
May 2015 sports events in Asia